Bettina Sabatini (born 21 March 1966 in Aalborg, Denmark) is a retired female marathon runner from Italy.

She represented her native country at the 1992 Summer Olympics in Barcelona, Spain, where she ended up in 23rd place in the women's marathon race. She set her personal best (2:30:29) in 1991. She has 6 caps in national team from 1988 to 1994.

Achievements

References

External links
 

1966 births
Living people
Italian female long-distance runners
Italian female marathon runners
Athletes (track and field) at the 1992 Summer Olympics
Olympic athletes of Italy
World Athletics Championships athletes for Italy
20th-century Italian women
21st-century Italian women